Arctoconopa is a genus of crane fly in the family Limoniidae.

Species
A. aldrichi (Alexander, 1924)
A. australis Savchenko, 1982
A. bifurcata (Alexander, 1919)
A. carbonipes (Alexander, 1929)
A. cinctipennis (Alexander, 1918)
A. forcipata (Lundstrom, 1915)
A. insulana Savchenko, 1971
A. kluane (Alexander, 1955)
A. manitobensis (Alexander, 1929)
A. megaura (Alexander, 1932)
A. melampodia (Loew, 1873)
A. obscuripes (Zetterstedt, 1851)
A. pahasapa (Alexander, 1955)
A. painteri (Alexander, 1929)
A. quadrivittata (Siebke, 1872)
A. taimyrensis (Lackschewitz, 1964)
A. zonata (Zetterstedt, 1851)

References

Limoniidae
Nematocera genera